Mdletshe Albert Mazibuko is a member of Ladysmith Black Mambazo, a South African choral group founded in 1960 by his cousin Joseph.

Albert was born in Ladysmith, South Africa, and was the eldest of six sons; the others being Milton, Funokwakhe, Mehlo, Abednego, and Ngali Mazibuko]].  He grew up on a farm. Although his father Gaphu Densa believed in the importance of education it was necessary for Albert to leave school early and he worked full-time on the farm between the ages of eight and fifteen.  He worked as a manual labourer in a number of jobs including working in an asbestos-making factory prior to joining Mambazo. Albert joined Mambazo in 1969 as a tenor voice, with his brother Milton as an alto voice. Aside from Joseph Shabalala, Albert is the only original member left in the group and has seen many changes; whereas the early line-ups were formed of a few Shabalalas and two Mazibukos, the group largely included members unrelated to Joseph.

After the killing of his brother Milton on the 26th of March in 1984 after the Ibhayibheli Liyindlela album  (by which time his brothers Funokwakhe Mazibuko retired from mambazo in 1985  after the Ulwandle Olungcwele album and Ngali Mazibuko had retired from mambazo in 1974 after the Umama lo album whilst his youngest brother Abednego had joined), Albert remained in the line-up and has been a full-time member of the group since 1973.

References

1946 births
Ladysmith Black Mambazo members
20th-century South African male singers
Living people
21st-century South African male singers